Tanda may refer to:

Places
Tanda, Ambedkar Nagar, India, a city and municipal board
Tanda (Bor), Serbia, a village
Tanda, Bengal, a historical medieval city
Tanda Dam and Lake, Khyber Pakhtunkhwa
Tanda Department, a department in Ivory Coast
Tanda, Egypt, a town
Tanda, Gujrat, Pakistan, a town
Tanda, Ivory Coast, a town in Ivory Coast
Tanda, Khyber Pakhtunkhwa, Pakistan, Town & Union Council
Tanda, Niger, a village and rural commune
Tanda, Raebareli, a village in Uttar Pradesh, India
Tanda, Rampur, India, a city and municipal board
Tanda, Russia, a rural locality (selo) in the Sakha Republic, Russia
Tanda, Bhopal, a village in India

People 
Nicola Tanda (1928–2016), Italian philologist, literary critic and writer
Dario Tanda (born 1995), Dutch-born footballer

Other uses 
Tanda (informal loan club), voluntary rotating loan associations
Tanda (milonga), a collection of songs in the same genre played by an orchestra
MV Tanda, a coaster or coastal trading vessel originally named Empire Seacoast

See also

 Danda (disambiguation)
Tonda (disambiguation)